Ellenburg Depot is a hamlet in Clinton County, New York, United States. Ellenburg Depot has a post office with ZIP code 12935, which opened on June 29, 1859.

References

Hamlets in Clinton County, New York
Hamlets in New York (state)